Australian singer and songwriter, Celia Pavey (known professionally as Vera Blue) has released three studio albums, one live album, two extended play, and twenty singles (including three as featured artist). In 2013, Pavey auditioned for and placed third on second season of The Voice (Australia).

Since August 2015, Pavey has released music under the name Vera Blue.

Discography

Studio albums

Live albums

Extended plays

Singles

As lead artist

As featured artist

Promotional singles

Guest appearances

Other charted and certified songs

Notes

References

Discographies of Australian artists
Pop music discographies